WKTJ-FM is an American FM radio station licensed to Farmington, Maine, known on air as Big Hits 99-3 KTJ, broadcasting a full-service adult hits format.

WKTJ first came on air as an AM station (1380 on the dial) in 1959, with the co-owned FM signing on in 1973. The AM station played mostly a pop format (with a country and adult contemporary influence) in the 1970s and 1980s, but left the air in the early 1990s. As the only commercial radio station located in Franklin County, WKTJ is widely listened to in the community, with live DJs throughout the day and local features and sports during the school year. (Two non-commercial radio stations also originate from the county: WRGY in Rangeley and University of Maine at Farmington's WUMF.)

Programming history
In January 2005, the station relaunched as "Big Hits 99.3 KTJ" with a classic hits/oldies format, while continuing with local shows such as The General Store Variety Hour and The Maine Music Hour. Beginning September 2011, WKTJ shifted to its current adult hits format.

The station also carries Boston Red Sox baseball (the WKTJ website says the station is the longest-running Red Sox radio affiliate, dating back to 1962) as well as local high school sports.

External links

KTJ
Adult hits radio stations in the United States
Franklin County, Maine
Farmington, Maine
Radio stations established in 1973
1973 establishments in Maine